Brian Frasure is a Paralympian athlete from the United States competing mainly in category T44 sprint events.

He competed in the 2000 Summer Paralympics in Sydney, Australia.  There he won a silver medal in the men's 100 metres - T44 event and was disqualified in the men's 200 metres - T44 event. He'd tested positive for Nandrolone. This was later overturned as there was no evidence of advertent use. He also competed at the 2004 Summer Paralympics in Athens, Greece, where he won a gold medal in the men's 4 x 100 metre relay - T42-46 event, a gold medal in the men's 4 x 400 metre relay - T42-46 event, a silver medal in the men's 100 metres - T44 event, and a bronze medal in the men's 200 metres - T44 event. He also competed in the T44 200 metres, breaking the world record in the heats but was disqualified in the final.  He also competed at the 2008 Summer Paralympics in Beijing, China, winning a gold medal in the men's 4 x 100 metre relay - T42-46 event and a bronze medal in the men's 100 metres - T44 event.

Frasure is also a prosthetist and fitted Oscar Pistorius with his first pair of Ossur Flex-Foot Cheetah carbon fiber running blades.

See also
The Mechanics of Running Blades

References

External links
 
 

Paralympic track and field athletes of the United States
Athletes (track and field) at the 2000 Summer Paralympics
Athletes (track and field) at the 2004 Summer Paralympics
Athletes (track and field) at the 2008 Summer Paralympics
Paralympic gold medalists for the United States
Paralympic silver medalists for the United States
Paralympic bronze medalists for the United States
American male sprinters
Year of birth missing (living people)
Living people
Medalists at the 2000 Summer Paralympics
Medalists at the 2004 Summer Paralympics
Medalists at the 2008 Summer Paralympics
Doping cases in athletics
American sportspeople in doping cases
Paralympic medalists in athletics (track and field)
Sprinters with limb difference
Paralympic sprinters
21st-century American people